"Days Like These" is a song by British rock band Asia, issued as a 7" single on 17 August 1990 in Europe by Geffen Records. It had previously appeared on their compilation album Then & Now, released three days before, while its B-side, "Voice of America", was derived from the third studio album, Astra (1985). In the United States, two promotion only CD singles were also available. This unusually optimistic and upbeat Asia song was a major hit on rock radio, reaching #2 on the Billboard "Mainstream Rock" chart.

"Days Like These" was written by Steve Jones, the past leader for The Unforgiven, and produced/engineered by Frank Wolf. It features Steve Lukather, Toto guitarist, and well-known studio musician on lead guitar.

In contrast to the rest of the new songs from Then & Now, "Days Like These" has been well received. On AllMusic, Tom Demalon has noted that it "nearly matches the band's strong debut material". An official music video was shot for the song and it gained considerable airplay during the summer of 1990 and was a number two hit on the Mainstream Rock chart. Despite this, the single peaked at number 64 on the Billboard Hot 100 and was the last chart entry for Asia in the United States.

Track listing

Personnel

Asia
 John Wetton – lead vocals, backing vocals, bass
 Geoff Downes – keyboards
 Carl Palmer – drums, percussion

Additional musicians
 Steve Lukather – guitar

Technical personnel
 Frank Wolf – producer, engineer

Charts

References

Asia (band) songs
1990 songs
1990 singles
Geffen Records singles